Zarem (also Romanized as Zārem and Zāharam; also known as Vārem) is a village in Shirvan Rural District, in the Central District of Borujerd County, Lorestan Province, Iran. At the 2006 census, its population was 479, in 115 families.

References 

Towns and villages in Borujerd County